The American Horticultural Society (AHS) is a nonprofit, membership-based organization that promotes excellence in American horticulture. It is headquartered at River Farm in Alexandria, Virginia.

History

Established in 1922, the AHS is one of the oldest national gardening organizations in the United States. Today's organization resulted from the merger of three gardening groups: the current namesake American Horticultural Society, the National Horticultural Society, and the American Horticultural Council.

Publications

In addition to publishing horticultural reference books, the organization publishes a bi-monthly magazine, The American Gardener, which is a member benefit. The American Horticultural Society also publishes a monthly online e-bulletin.

Education

The American Horticultural Society conducts various events annually, to educate and inspire gardeners. Each summer the AHS conducts the National Children and Youth Garden Symposium, which is a forum for educators, garden designers, community leaders, and children’s gardening advocates to network and collaborate on techniques and practices to engage children with the natural world. Education is further instilled in the Society’s internship program, which hires interns in editorial/communications, member programs, and horticulture.

National awards

Through its national awards programs, AHS celebrates outstanding achievements, encourages excellence, and inspires innovation in the art and science of horticulture. The Great American Gardeners Awards honor horticultural heroes; the AHS Book Awards celebrate great gardening literature, and Growing Good Kids Awards recognize outstanding children's gardening and nature books.

Membership

AHS offers a membership program to those interested in gardening and horticulture. Membership includes a subscription to The American Gardener, free admission privileges or discounts at 300 gardens and arboreta through the Reciprocal Admissions Program (RAP), discounted or free admission to flower and garden shows, the annual Seed Exchange, and special discounts on programs and products.

River Farm

In 1973, the Society relocated their headquarters to River Farm, overlooking the Potomac River in Alexandria, Virginia.  The property was acquired by the AHS with a gift from Enid Annenberg Haupt, who stipulated that the historic property, once part of George Washington's estate, would be open for the public to enjoy. The property is home to numerous gardens, including a four-acre Andre Bluemel Meadow and a Children's Garden. Annual events at River Farm include the Spring Garden Market plant sale, garden workshops for children, a banquet for AHS award winners, and a gala fundraiser each fall.

The Board of Directors of the AHS voted to sell the River Farm property in September 2020. The proposed sale generated controversy both within the organization, and was met with resistance from the local government. Although the AHS had initially planned to dispose of the property by Spring 2021, that deadline was not met.

Partners

The Horticultural and Corporate Partners programs join other allied organizations that help to support the Society's vision of making a nation of gardeners. In August 2020, the AHS partnered with Elodie's Naturals to teach skincare chemistry sourced from vegetables and plants.

References

External links 
 American Horticultural Society

Horticultural organizations based in the United States
1922 establishments in the United States
Organizations established in 1922
Tourist attractions in Fairfax County, Virginia
Non-profit organizations based in Alexandria, Virginia
501(c)(3) organizations